The Khadayata caste is a Vania caste which is one of the higher castes in Gujarat. The 'Khadayata ' caste in the Baniya/ Vania community among Hindus originated in the state of Gujarat in India. It has existence across the world. The people of this community are known for business activities.

References

External links
https://khadayata.net/
http://www.khadayatajyoti.org
http://www.khadayatasurksha.org
http://www.ksna.org
https://web.archive.org/web/20100129000142/http://www.khadayataonline.com/
http://www.facebook.com/khadayata.jyoti
https://www.facebook.com/groups/144653225607172/

Bania communities
Social groups of Gujarat
Economy of Gujarat